Revolution Summer may refer to:

 Revolution Summer (film), a film directed by Miles Montalbano
 Revolution Summer (album), a soundtrack album by Jonathan Richman
 Revolution Summer (music), a punk rock music movement related to the genres of post-hardcore and emo
 "Revolution Summer", a song by Pussy Galore (band)